John Quinn Weitzel M.M. (May 10, 1928  –  December 30, 2022) was an American prelate of the Roman Catholic Church who served as bishop of the Diocese of Samoa-Pago Pago in American Samoa.

Biography

Early life
Weitzel was born in Chicago, Illinois, on May 10, 1928. He was ordained a Catholic priest for the Catholic Foreign Mission Society of America on June 11, 1955.

Bishop of Samoa-Pago Pago
Pope John Paul II appointed Weitzel as the first bishop of the newly-erected diocese of Samoa-Pago Pago on June 9, 1986. He was consecrated on October 29, 1986 by Pio Taofinu'u, with Joseph Ferrario, and Patrick Vincent Hurley as co-consecrators.

Weitzel's letter of resignation as bishop of Samoa-Pago Pago was accepted by Pope Francis on Friday, May 31, 2013.

Death
Weitzel died on December 30, 2022, following a short illness.

See also

 Catholic Church hierarchy
 Catholic Church in the United States
 Historical list of the Catholic bishops of the United States
 List of Catholic bishops of the United States
 Lists of patriarchs, archbishops, and bishops

References

External links
 Roman Catholic Diocese of Samoa–Pago Pago Official Site
 John Quinn Weitzel at Catholic Hierarchy

 

1928 births
2022 deaths
Roman Catholic bishops of Samoa–Pago Pago
Bishops appointed by Pope Francis
21st-century Roman Catholic bishops in the United States
Clergy from Chicago
Maryknoll bishops
American Roman Catholic missionaries
Roman Catholic missionaries in American Samoa
Catholics from Illinois